Phyllonorycter triflorella is a moth of the family Gracillariidae. It is known from France, Corsica, Sardinia, Italy and Croatia.

The larvae feed on Argyrolobium zanonii, Calicotome villosa, Cytisus villosus and Genista sericea. They mine the leaves of their host plant. They create an upper-surface tentiform mine that contracts so strongly that the margins of the leaflet close over the mine. Pupation takes place within the mine.

References

triflorella
Moths of Europe
Moths described in 1872